Kolve is a surname. Notable people with the surname include:

Ivar Kolve (born 1967), Norwegian jazz musician, brother of Kåre
Kåre Kolve (born 1964), Norwegian saxophonist
Verdel Kolve (born 1934), American English professor

See also
Kolbe